Déjame Volar is the fifth album by the Mexican singer Patricia Manterola.

Track listing

References

2003 albums
Patricia Manterola albums